Singoor is a village located in lower Chitral District, Khyber Pakhtunkhwa Province of Pakistan. Gankorineotek cemetery is also found here.

History
The area is home to several ancient burial sites, dating back to the Vedic period.

Educational Institutions
Singoor Public School

See also
Seenlasht
Orghoch

References

Chitral District
Populated places in Chitral District